Ytre Storevatnet is a lake in the municipality of Bykle in Agder county, Norway. The  lake makes up the northernmost part of the Svartevatnet reservoir that empties into the Sira River system. The lake is located just south of the lake Blåsjø and southwest of Botsvatn.

See also
List of lakes in Aust-Agder

References

Bykle
Lakes of Agder